Daniel George Hayes Croly (1846-1916) was an Anglican priest in Ireland.

Croly was educated at Trinity College, Dublin and ordained in 1873. After a curacies in Kilcommon and Pullathomas he held incumbencies in Killaraght, Easky and Killala.He was Archdeacon of Killala from 1904 until 1911; from 1911 to 1915.

Notes

Alumni of Trinity College Dublin
19th-century Irish Anglican priests
20th-century Irish Anglican priests
Archdeacons of Killala
Deans of Killala
1846 births
1916 deaths